Hans-Peter Steinacher (born 9 September 1968 in Zell am See) is an Austrian sailor and Olympic champion. He won a gold medal in the Tornado Class with Roman Hagara at the 2000 Summer Olympics in Sydney. They won the gold medal again at the 2004 Summer Olympics in Athens.

Along with his teammate Roman Hagara, he has won the Austrian Sports Personality of the Year twice, in 2000 and 2004.

In December 2021 Alinghi founder Ernesto Bertarelli Hans Peter Steinacher announced the launch of the new Alinghi Red Bull Racing.  Bertarelli will continue to represent the Société Nautique de Genève, the yacht club they won the 2003 Louis Vuitton Cup, the 2003 America's Cup, and the 2007 America's Cup for.

America's Cup & Red Bull Youth America's Cup 

Since 2009 he has focused more on the big boat scene with Roman Hagara, including competing on an America's Cup yacht at Hagara-Steinacher Racing (HS Racing) in the 2011–13 America's Cup World Series.

Under the flag of the United States for San Francisco's Golden Gate Yacht Club, the duo competed in a 2013 America's Cup World Series event in Naples, Italy. Racing this event gave the team firsthand experience in what has become Hagara and Steinacher's primary focus, mentoring the next generation of sailors on the next generation of sail boats: hydrofoils.

Extreme Sailing Series 

Hans-Peter Steinacher is currently also the tactician for Red Bull Extreme Sailing Team in the Extreme Sailing Series. With the series' announcement that foiling catamarans will be part of its future, Hagara and Steinacher have taken on a full crew of athletes who honed their skills in the Red Bull Youth America's Cup.

When the Extremes collapsed, the team made the move onto the GC32 Racing Tour with fellow ESS teams, Alinghi and Oman Air.
They finished third overall in the 2019 season, behind their ESS rivals.
In 2020, Steinacher and Hagara announced that the year's season would be their last.

Mentoring Young Talents 

As of 2015, Hans-Peter Steinacher and Roman Hagara mentor young sailors in three series: as sports directors of Red Bull Foiling Generation and the Red Bull Youth America's Cup, and as leaders of the Red Bull Extreme Sailing Team that competes in the Extreme Sailing Series. Hagara and Steinacher look for the best and most talented sailors in their respective age groups to give them insights and show them a new way of sailing.

Background 

Originally a ski racer, Hans-Peter Steinacher moved into sailing at the age of 17, where he took full advantage of the skills learned on the snow. Back then, he competed against his now teammate Roman Hagara. For years, the now teammates competed against each other until they decided in 1997 to train for the 2000 Olympics together. Before 1997 Hans-Peter Steinacher was helming a tornado catamaran, now he is the team's tactician. In the 2000 Olympics, the team was the very first to work with customized sails. “In doing this we actually created a new style of how to sail a boat,” Steinacher is cited. Since then, they have always focused on being ahead of technological developments, which now shows in their involvement in the foiling technology.

In his spare time, Hans-Peter Steinacher is also a licensed pilot.

References

External links 
 Alinghi RedBull official site
 
 
 

1968 births
Living people
Austrian male sailors (sport)
Sailors at the 2000 Summer Olympics – Tornado
Sailors at the 2004 Summer Olympics – Tornado
Sailors at the 2008 Summer Olympics – Tornado
Olympic sailors of Austria
Olympic gold medalists for Austria
People from Zell am See
Olympic medalists in sailing
Medalists at the 2004 Summer Olympics
Extreme Sailing Series sailors
Medalists at the 2000 Summer Olympics
Tornado class world champions
World champions in sailing for Austria
Sportspeople from Salzburg (state)